Innokenty Zharov (born 23 November 1968) is a Russian sprinter. He competed in the men's 4 × 400 metres relay at the 1996 Summer Olympics.

References

1968 births
Living people
Place of birth missing (living people)
Russian male sprinters
Olympic male sprinters
Olympic athletes of Russia
Athletes (track and field) at the 1996 Summer Olympics
Universiade silver medalists for Russia
Universiade medalists in athletics (track and field)
World Athletics Championships athletes for Russia
Russian Athletics Championships winners
20th-century Russian people